The Church of the Holy Transfiguration of Christ on the Mount is a modest, single-room, hand-built wooden church near the summit of Meads Mountain in Woodstock, New York, originally constructed c. 1891 by William Mead and his wife, Anna Della Mead.  Services in the Sarum Rite of the Western Orthodox (Catholic) tradition are held each Sunday morning.  It is purported to be the repository of a Marian weeping Icon.  In the 1960s, Father Francis, the much-beloved "hippie priest", here welcomed hippies who had congregated in town during those years that culminated in the famous art and music festival.  Fr. Francis began the practice of this lesser known branch of Catholicism, which acknowledges the Pope as an earthly spiritual leader but, unlike classical Roman Catholicism, does not consider the Pope to be supreme or infallible.  The Church has been placed on the National Register of Historic Places, due in meaningful part to the devoted efforts of Father Deacon John Nelson, an understudy of Fr. Francis and peer of contemporary spiritual leaders who reverently maintained the Church until his death on August 1, 2017.  Fr. John's remains were committed to the earth alongside the structure following a traditional requiem Mass.

References

External links
Official site (?)

Churches in Ulster County, New York
National Register of Historic Places in Ulster County, New York
Churches completed in 1891
19th-century churches in the United States
Woodstock, New York
Churches on the National Register of Historic Places in New York (state)